Jordan Farr (born October 5, 1994) is an American professional soccer player who plays as a goalkeeper who currently plays for San Antonio FC.

Career

College and amateur
Farr played college soccer at Corban University between 2013 and 2017, which included a redshirted 2014 season. He made 80 appearances for the Warriors during his time at Corban.

While at college, Farr played in the USL PDL with both Charlotte Eagles and Portland Timbers U23.

Professional
On February 2, 2018, Farr signed for United Soccer League side Indy Eleven.

Prior to the 2021 USL Championship Playoffs, San Antonio FC acquired Farr on an emergency loan following an injury to goalkeeper Matt Cardone.

Following the 2021 season, it was announced that Farr's contract option was declined by Indy Eleven.

On January 26, 2022, Farr signed with San Antonio FC. On May 12, 2022, Farr was named USL Championship player of the month for April 2022 due to a league high 18 saves and 4 shutouts throughout the month. On November 8, 2022, Farr was named 2022 USL Championship Goalkeeper of the Year.

Career statistics

Honours
Individual
USL Championship All League First Team: 2022
USL Championship Goalkeeper of the Year: 2022

Personal
In February 2023, Farr appeared in a commercial for Old Trapper Beef Jerky.

References

External links
 Corban Athletics bio
 Indy Eleven bio
 

1994 births
Living people
American soccer players
Association football goalkeepers
Charlotte Eagles players
Portland Timbers U23s players
Indy Eleven players
San Antonio FC players
Soccer players from Oregon
USL League Two players
USL Championship players
Sportspeople from Salem, Oregon
Corban University alumni
College men's soccer players in the United States